The Bomokandi River  is a river in the Congo Basin in the Democratic Republic of the Congo.

The river originates in the southeast of Haut-Uélé province near Gombari, and flows in a ENE direction through Haut-Uélé and Bas-Uélé past Rungu and Poko to join the Uele River at Bambili.

References

Rivers of the Democratic Republic of the Congo
Uele River